Oppression is malicious or unjust treatment or exercise of power, often under the guise of governmental authority or cultural opprobrium. It is related to regimentation, class society and  punishment. Oppression may be overt or covert, depending on how it is practiced. Oppression refers to discrimination when the injustice does not target and may not directly afflict everyone in society but instead targets or disproportionately impacts specific groups of people.

No universally accepted model or terminology has yet emerged to describe oppression in its entirety, although some scholars cite evidence of different types of oppression, such as social oppression, cultural, political, religious/belief,  institutional oppression, and economic oppression. 
The Universal Declaration of Human Rights offers a benchmark from which to assess both individual and structural models of oppression.  The concept, popularized in Marx and Engels' Communist Manifesto of 1848, is often used to justify state persecution.

Authoritarian oppression
The word oppress comes from the Latin oppressus, past participle of opprimere, ("to press against", "to squeeze", "to suffocate"). Thus, when authoritarian governments use oppression to subjugate the people, they want their citizenry to feel that "pressing down", and to live in fear that if they displease the authorities they will, in a metaphorical sense, be "squeezed" and "suffocated", e.g., thrown in a dank, dark, state prison or summarily executed. Such governments oppress the people using restriction, control, terror, hopelessness, and despair. The tyrant's tools of oppression include, for example, extremely harsh punishments for "unpatriotic" statements; developing a loyal, guileful secret police force; prohibiting freedom of assembly, freedom of speech, and freedom of the press; controlling the monetary system and economy; and imprisoning or killing activists or other leaders who might pose a threat to their power.

Socioeconomic, political, legal, cultural, and institutional oppression
Oppression also refers to a more insidious type of manipulation and control, in this instance involving the subjugation and marginalization of specific groups of people within a country or society, such as: girls and women, boys and men, people of color, religious communities, citizens in poverty, LGBT people, youth and children, and many more. This socioeconomic, cultural, political, legal, and institutional oppression (hereinafter, "social oppression") probably occurs in every country, culture, and society, including the most advanced democracies, such as the United States, Japan, Costa Rica, Sweden, and Canada.

A single, widely accepted definition of social oppression does not yet exist, although there are commonalities. Taylor (2016) defined (social) oppression in this way:

Oppression is a form of injustice that occurs when one social group is subordinated while another is privileged, and oppression is maintained by a variety of different mechanisms including social norms, stereotypes and institutional rules. A key feature of oppression is that it is perpetrated by and affects social groups. ... [Oppression]  occurs when a particular social group is unjustly subordinated, and where that subordination is not necessarily deliberate but instead results from a complex network of social restrictions, ranging from laws and institutions to implicit biases and stereotypes. In such cases, there may be no deliberate attempt to subordinate the relevant group, but the group is nonetheless unjustly subordinated by this network of social constraints. 

Harvey (1999) suggested the term "civilized oppression", which he introduced as follows:

It is harder still to become aware of what I call 'civilized Oppression,' that involves neither physical violence nor the use of law. Yet these subtle forms are by far the most prevalent in Western industrialized societies. This work will focus on issues that are common to such subtle oppression in several different contexts (such as racism, classism, and sexism) ... Analyzing what is involved in civilized oppression includes analyzing the kinds of mechanisms used, the power relations at work, the systems controlling perceptions and information, the kinds of harms inflicted on the victims, and the reasons why this oppression is so hard to see even by contributing agents.

Research and theory development on social oppression has advanced apace since the 1980s with the publication of seminal books and articles, and the cross-pollination of ideas and discussion among diverse disciplines, such as: feminism, sociology, psychology, philosophy, and political science. Nonetheless, more fully understanding the problem remains an extremely complicated challenge for scholars. Improved understanding will likely involve, for example, comprehending more completely the historical antecedents of current social oppression; the commonalities (and lack thereof) among the various social groups damaged by social oppression (and the individual human beings who make up those groups); and the complex interplay between and amongst sociocultural, political, economic, psychological, and legal forces that cause and support oppression.

Social oppression

A common conception of social oppression is seen as when a single group in society unjustly takes advantage of, and exercises power over, another group using dominance and subordination. This then results in the socially supported mistreatment and exploitation of a group of individuals by those with relative power. In a social group setting, oppression may be based on many ideas, such as poverty, gender, class, race, caste, or other categories. According to Iris Marion Young, due to this pluralistic nature of oppression, it is difficult to construct a definition that applies to all forms of oppression. Therefore, she argues one should focus on the characteristics different forms of oppression might exhibit or have in common. In order to do so, Iris Young developed 5 different characteristics or ‘faces’ of oppression. Each form of oppression possesses at least one of these characteristics which are: exploitation, marginalization, powerlessness, cultural imperialism and violence. Interestingly, Young’s conception of oppression, does not involve an ‘active oppressor’. This means that oppression can occur, without people actively oppressing others  Namely, Young argues that “...oppression is the inhibition of a group through a vast network of everyday practices, attitudes, assumptions, behaviors, and institutional rules. Oppression is structural or systemic. The systemic character of oppression implies that an oppressed group need not have a correlate oppressing group”. Structural or systemic refers to “the rules that constitute and regulate the major sectors of life such as family relations, property ownership and exchange, political powers and responsibilities, and so on.”. Young's conception of oppression is therefore in contrast with other common notions of oppression; where an identifiable oppressing group is assumed. Another example of social oppression given by Young is when a specific social group is denied access to education that may hinder their lives in later life. Economic oppression is the divide between two classes of society. These were once determined by factors such slavery, property rights, disenfranchisement, and forced displacement of livelihood. Each divide yielded various treatments and attitudes towards each group.

Social oppression derives from power dynamics and imbalances related to the social location of a group or individual. Social location, as defined by Lynn Weber, is "an individual's or a group's social 'place' in the race, class, gender and sexuality hierarchies, as well as in other critical social hierarchies such as age, ethnicity, and nation". An individual's social location often determines how they will be perceived and treated by others in society. Three elements shape whether a group or individual can exercise power: the power to design or manipulate the rules and regulations, the capacity to win competitions through the exercise of political or economic force, and the ability to write and document social and political history. There are four predominant social hierarchies, race, class, gender and sexuality, that contribute to social oppression.

Privilege
Lynn Weber, among some other political theorists, argues that oppression persists because most individuals fail to recognize it; that is, discrimination is often not visible to those who are not in the midst of it. Privilege refers to a sociopolitical immunity one group has over others derived from particular societal benefits. Many of the groups who have privilege over gender, race, or sexuality, for example, can be unaware of the power their privilege holds. These inequalities further perpetuate themselves because those who are oppressed rarely have access to resources that would allow them to escape their maltreatment. This can lead to internalized oppression, where subordinate groups essentially give up the fight to get access to equality, and accept their fate as a non-dominant group.

Racial oppression
Race or racial oppression is defined as: " ...burdening a specific race with unjust or cruel restraints or impositions. Racial oppression may be social, systematic, institutionalized, or internalized. Social forms of racial oppression include exploitation and mistreatment that is socially supported." In his 1972 work, Racial Oppression in America, sociologist Bob Blauner proposes five primary forms of racial oppression in United States history: genocide and geographical displacement, slavery, second-class citizenship, non-citizen labor, and diffuse racial discrimination. Blauner stated that even after civil rights legislation abolished legally-sanctioned segregation, racial oppression remained a reality in the United States and "racial groups and racial oppression are central features of the American social dynamic".

Class Discrimination
Class oppression, sometimes referred to as classism, can be defined as prejudice and discrimination based on social class. Class is a social ranking system which is based on income, wealth, education, status, and power. A class is a large group of people who share similar economic or social positions based on their income, wealth, property ownership, job status, education, skills, and power in the economic and political sphere. The most commonly used class categories include: upper class, middle class, working class, and poor class. A majority of people in the United States self-identify in surveys as middle class, despite vast differences in income and status. Class is also experienced differently depending on race, gender, ethnicity, global location, disability, and more. Class oppression of the poor and working class can lead to deprivation of basic needs and a feeling of inferiority to higher-class people, as well as shame towards one's traditional class, race, gender, or ethnic heritage. In the United States, class has become racialized leaving the greater percentage of people of color living in poverty. Since class oppression is universal among the majority class in American society, at times it can seem invisible, however, it is a relevant issue that causes suffering for many.

Gender oppression

Gender oppression is a form of social oppression, which occurs due to belonging or seeming to belong to a specific gender. Historically, gender oppression  occurred through actual legal domination and subordination of men over women. Although the legal and civil position of women has greatly improved over the years especially in Western countries, this is arguably not enough. Namely, even key aspects of social life traditionally seen as ‘neutral’ such as language can sustain gender oppression according to Gertrude Postl (2017). This is due to sexist language and the lack of terms that relate to experiences specific to women. As an example, think about the term ‘sexual harassment’ that only got coined in 1975. Before this, the experience of women who suffered from sexual harassment arguably lacked the language to explain their experiences. Therefore, many (feminist) authors argue sexism, gender discrimination and gender oppression are still prevalent in today's society.

Young argues that women in particular suffer from gender-based exploitation, powerlessness, cultural imperialism, and violence (p. 64). To illustrate, gender exploitation relates to how the common labor division between men and women can be exploitative. She argues that, “[g]ender exploitation has two aspects, transfer of the fruits of material labor to men and transfer of nurturing and sexual energies to men.” (p. 50). Namely, in a heterosexual relationship, women often take care of unpaid households chores and child care labor, which benefits both the man as the women. In this sense, women are performing labor from which the man benefits and thus at least part of the value of this labor is transferred to the man. Interestingly, this exploitation need not be done consciously or even intentionally. As Young argues, oppression can occur without an active ‘oppressor’.

This nuanced definition of oppression might address some concerns, where feminist theories are seen to unjustly blame (all) men for the oppression of women. Namely, some argue that one can identify groups of men who do not oppose and even sympathize with feminist theories - but who are blamed by feminist theories of the oppression of women. If one agrees that gender oppression at least partly occurs due to social, cultural and institutional factors, which are in essence not actively caused by certain individuals but by a complex relationship of social groups and institutional rules - it would arguably be unjust to subsequently blame all men for the systematic and cultural oppression of women. Arguably, one can say that men are also subject to gender norms and stereotypes - the difference being that men overall seem to benefit from these norms. It is important to note as well that, despite not all men actively oppressing women - it is good to recognize how, in many parts of the world, women still objectively have less rights than men and are subsequently subordinated to the will of men.

Religious persecution 

Religious persecution is the systematic mistreatment of individuals because of their religious beliefs. According to Iris Young oppression can be divided into different categories such as powerlessness, exploitation, and violence.

An example of religious powerlessness existed during the 17th century when the Pilgrims, who wanted to escape the rule of the Church of England came to what is now called the United States. The pilgrims created their own religion which was another form of Protestantism, and after doing so they eventually passed laws in order to prevent other religions from prospering in their colony.  The Pilgrims and the leaders of other communities where Protestants were in the majority used their power over legislatures to oppress followers of other religions in the United States.

The second category of oppression, exploitation, has been seen in many different forms around the world when it comes to religion. The definition of exploitation is the action or fact of treating someone unfairly in order to benefit from their work. For example, during, and particularly after, the American Civil War, white Americans used Chinese immigrants in order to build the transcontinental railroads. During this time it was common for the Chinese immigrants to follow the religions of Buddhism, Taoism, and Confucianism, because of this the Chinese were considered different and therefore not equal to white Americans. Due to this view Chinese workers were denied equal pay, and they also suffered many hardships during the time which they spent working on the railroad.

The third and most extreme category of oppression is violence. According to the Merriam Webster's dictionary, violence is "the use of physical force so as to injure, abuse, damage, or destroy". Acts of religious violence which are committed against people who practice a particular religion  are classified as hate crimes. Since September 11th, 2001 the number of hate crimes which have been committed against Muslims in the United States has greatly increased. One such incident occurred on August 5, 2017 when three men bombed a Mosque in Minnesota because they felt that Muslims "'push their beliefs on everyone else'". Acts of religious violence are also committed against practitioners of other religions in addition to Islam.

Domination 
Addressing social oppression on both a macro and micro level, feminist Patricia Hill Collins discusses her "matrix of domination". The matrix of domination discusses the interrelated nature of four domains of power, including the structural, disciplinary, hegemonic, and interpersonal domains. Each of these spheres works to sustain current inequalities that are faced by marginalized, excluded or oppressed groups. The structural, disciplinary and hegemonic domains all operate on a macro level, creating social oppression through macro structures such as education, or the criminal justice system, which play out in the interpersonal sphere of everyday life through micro-oppressions.

Institutionalized oppression
"Institutional Oppression occurs when established laws, customs, and practices systemically reflect and produce inequities based on one's membership in targeted social identity groups. If oppressive consequences accrue to institutional laws, customs, or practices, the institution is oppressive whether or not the individuals maintaining those practices have oppressive intentions."

Institutionalized oppression allows for government, religious and business organizations and their employees to systematically favor specific groups of people based upon group identity. Dating back to colonization, the United States implemented the annihilation of Native Americans from lands that Euro-Americans wanted, and condoned the institution of slavery where Africans were brought to the 'New World' to be a source of free labor to expand the cotton and tobacco industry. Implementing these systems by the United States government was justified through religious grounding where "servants [were] bought and established as inheritable property".

Although the thirteenth, fourteenth, and fifteenth amendments freed African Americans, gave them citizenship, and provided them the right to vote, institutions such as some police departments continue to use oppressive systems against minorities. They train their officers to profile individuals based upon their racial heritage, and to exert excessive force to restrain them. Racial profiling and police brutality are "employed to control a population thought to be undesirable, undeserving, and under punished by established law". In both situations, police officers "rely on legal authority to exonerate their extralegal use of force; both respond to perceived threats and fears aroused by out-groups, especially— but not exclusively— racial minorities". For example, "blacks are: approximately four times more likely to be targeted for police use of force than their white counterparts; arrested and convicted for drug-related criminal activities at higher rates than their overall representation in the U.S. population; and are more likely to fear unlawful and harsh treatment by law enforcement officials". The International Association of Chiefs of Police collected data from police departments between the years 1995 and 2000 and found that 83% of incidents involving use-of-force against subjects of different races than the officer executing it involved a white officer and a black subject.

Institutionalized oppression is not only experienced by people of racial minorities, but can also affect those in the LGBT community. Oppression of the LGBT community in the United States dates back to President Eisenhower's presidency where he passed Executive Order 10450 in April 1953 which permitted non-binary sexual behaviors to be investigated by federal agencies. As a result of this order, "More than 800 federal employees resigned or were terminated in the two years following because their files linked them in some way with homosexuality."

States such as Arizona and Kansas passed laws in 2014 giving religious-based businesses "the right to refuse service to LGBT customers".

Economic oppression
The term economic oppression changes in meaning and significance over time, depending on its contextual application. In today's context, economic oppression may take several forms, including, but not limited to: serfdom, forced labour, low wages, denial of equal opportunity, bonded labour, practicing employment discrimination, and economic discrimination based on sex, nationality, race, and religion.

Ann Cudd describes the main forces of economic oppression as oppressive economic systems and direct and indirect forces. Even though capitalism and socialism are not inherently oppressive, they "lend themselves to oppression in characteristic ways". She defines direct forces of economic oppression as "restrictions on opportunities that are applied from the outside on the oppressed, including enslavement, segregation, employment discrimination, group-based harassment, opportunity inequality, neocolonialism, and governmental corruption". This allows for a dominant social group to maintain and maximize its wealth through the intentional exploitation of economically inferior subordinates. With indirect forces (also known as oppression by choice), "the oppressed are co-opted into making individual choices that add to their own oppression". The oppressed are faced with having to decide to go against their social good, and even against their own good. If they choose otherwise, they have to choose against their interests, which may lead to resentment by their group.

An example of direct forces of economic oppression is employment discrimination in the form of the gender pay gap. Restrictions on women's access to and participation in the workforce like the wage gap is an "inequality most identified with industrialized nations with nominal equal opportunity laws; legal and cultural restrictions on access to education and jobs, inequities most identified with developing nations; and unequal access to capital, variable but identified as a difficulty in both industrialized and developing nations". In the United States, the median weekly earnings for women were 82 percent of the median weekly earnings for men in 2016. Some argue women are prevented from achieving complete gender equality in the workplace because of the "ideal-worker norm," which "defines the committed worker as someone who works full-time and full force for forty years straight," a situation designed for the male sex.

Women, in contrast, are still expected to fulfill the caretaker role and take time off for domestic needs such as pregnancy and ill family members, preventing them from conforming to the "ideal-worker norm". With the current norm in place, women are forced to juggle full-time jobs and family care at home. Others believe that this difference in wage earnings is likely due to the supply and demand for women in the market because of family obligations. Eber and Weichselbaumer argue that "over time, raw wage differentials worldwide have fallen substantially. Most of this decrease is due to better labor market endowments of females".

Indirect economic oppression is exemplified when individuals work abroad to support their families. Outsourced employees, working abroad generally little to no bargaining power not only with their employers, but with immigration authorities as well. They could be forced to accept low wages and work in poor living conditions. And by working abroad, an outsourced employee contributes to the economy of a foreign country instead of their own. Veltman and Piper describe the effects of outsourcing on female laborers abroad:
Her work may be oppressive first in respects of being heteronomous: she may enter work under conditions of constraint; her work may bear no part of reflectively held life goals; and she may not even have the: freedom of bodily movement at work. Her work may also fail to permit a meaningful measure of economic independence or to help her support herself or her family, which she identifies as the very purpose of her working.

By deciding to work abroad, laborers are "reinforcing the forces of economic oppression that presented them with such poor options".

Oppression and Intersectionality 
A different approach on oppression, called the intersectional approach was introduced by Kimberlé Williams Chrenshaw referring to the various ways in which race and gender interact  to  shape the multiple dimensions of black women’s employment experiences (Chrensaw, 2008 p. 279).  Elena Ruiz defines intersectionality as a form of oppression containing multiple social vectors and overlapping identity categories such as sex, race and class that is not ready visible in single identities but has to be taken into account as an integral, robust human experience (Ruiz, 2017, p. 335).

An intersectional approach to oppression thus includes attending to the differential ways different grounds for oppression such as gender, race, sexuality, class, religion, etc. work together to create a unique situation for certain oppressed people. Take the case of black women as identified by Crenshaw herself. Only looking from a purely feminist perspective at oppression of women in general would undermine the oppressed experiences of black women. This is different from white women, as the latter are not oppressed on the basis of race as well whereas black women are. Crenshaw argues that viewing feminism as categorizing all women as one cohesive category of oppressed people obscures differences of experiences of oppression within such groups (Crenshaw, 1991, p. 244).

Intersectionality is not restricted to black women. For example, it is also relevant for Latina women and their place within feminism and anti-racism (Collins, 2011, p. 3). Moreover, think of other examples where different grounds for oppression might come together for some such as in the case of people with disabilities, certain sexual orientations or religion.

This intersectional approach has been highly influential in academic fields studying different forms of social oppression.[1] However, although Crenshaw (2008, p. 279) argues her intersectional approach captures important differences within certain oppressed groups, Patricia Hill Collins (et al., 1995, p. 492) objects that her approach is unable to capture the macro-level systemic nature of intersectional oppression. In other words, Crenshaw’s concept of intersectionality captures the individual experiences of oppressed persons which do not solely fall under one header of sexism, racism or something else. However, it is not suited to capture the way grounds for oppression such as for example sexism and racism work together at a (macro) societal level. Both conjoin to influence the unique experience of oppression as felt by for example black women.

One way to address both the pluralistic and systemic nature of oppression is done by Iris Marion Young. Namely, Young identifies five key characteristics or ‘faces’ that can be found in all forms of oppression. Moreover, her framework is specifically tailored to capture the systemic nature of oppression. As such, Young’s five faces of oppression might be used to capture the systemic and structural macro-level nature of intersectional oppression.

In addition, one might wonder as Jennifer Nash (2008, p. 9-10) has done what the limits of intersectionality are. Does this approach only concern certain marginalized and oppressed groups or could everyone in some way identify as intersectional? After all, ‘even’ white men could identify as intersectional in being white, men, speaking a certain language and having a certain nationality. However, for the purpose of this Wikipedia entry, intersectionality should be viewed within the limits of the perspective of oppression. Guiding questions in this regard concern in what way an intersectional approach might bring to the surface certain previously obscured experiences of oppression.

In addition, Jennifer Nash (2008, p. 11-12) also argues that so far, intersectional approaches have focused either on intersections between forms or grounds for oppression or privilege whereas the two can also work together. Indeed, the value of an intersectional approach on oppression is to see how different forms of oppression such as the ones mentioned in this entry intersect with each other and with the privileges held by others. Racial, economic, class-based, religious, gender-based, authoritarian and social oppression in general can often intersect in many different ways and co-exist with opposite forms of privileges to create novel and unique ways oppression might take shape. Taking notice of these intricate ways of oppression is where intersectionality proves its value.

Feminism and equal rights
Although a relatively modern form of resistance, feminism's origins can be traced back to the course of events which led up to the introduction of the Equal Rights Amendment (ERA) in 1923. While the ERA was created in order to address the need for equal protection under the law for both men and women in the workplace, it spurred a rise in feminism which has come to represent women's search for equal opportunity and respect in patriarchal societies, across all social, cultural, and political spheres. Demonstrations and marches have been a popular medium of support, with the January 21, 2017, Women's March's replication in major cities across the world drawing tens of thousands of supporters.

"Resistance"
Resistance to oppression has been linked to a moral obligation, an act deemed necessary for the preservation of self and society. Resistance is sometimes labeled as "lawlessness, belligerence, envy, or laziness".

See also

Notes

References

Sources
Cudd, Ann E. (2006). Analyzing oppression. Oxford University Press US. .
Deutsch, M. (2006). A framework for thinking about oppression and its change. Social Justice Research, 19(1), 7–41. doi:10.1007/s11211-006-9998-3
Gil, David G. (2013). Confronting injustice and oppression: Concepts and strategies for social workers (2nd ed.). New York City, NY: Columbia University Press.   OCLC 846740522
Harvey, J. (1999). Civilized oppression. Lanham, MD: Rowman & Littlefield. 
Marin, Mara (2017). Connected by commitment: Oppression and our responsibility to undermine it. New York City, NY: Oxford University Press.  OCLC 989519441
Noël, Lise (1989). L'Intolérance. Une problématique générale (Intolerance: a general survey). Montréal (Québec), Canada: Boréal. . OCLC 20723090.
Opotow, S. (1990). Moral exclusion and injustice: an introduction. Journal of Social Issues, 46(1), 1–20. doi:10.1111/j.1540-4560.1990.tb00268.x
Young, Iris (1990). Justice and the politics of difference (2011 reissue; foreword by Danielle Allen). Princeton, NJ: Princeton University Press.   OCLC 778811811
Young-Bruehl, Elisabeth (1996). The anatomy of prejudices. Cambridge, MA: Harvard University Press. . OCLC 442469051.

Further reading

 
 
 
 
 
 
 
 
 
 

Abuse
Causality
Discrimination
Injustice
Majority–minority relations
Neuroethology
Power (social and political) concepts
Social privilege
Social concepts
Social inequality